The mimic garden eel (Heteroconger pellegrini), also known as the speckled garden eel, is a species of garden eel from the East Pacific.

It reaches  in length. Like other garden eels, it is found in groups in sandy areas. Typically, only its head and upper part of the body protrudes from the sand, and it will retreat entirely if approached by large fish or divers. They feed on zooplankton.

References

Heteroconger
Taxa named by Peter Henry John Castle
Fish described in 1999